Kudi Yedamaithe is an Indian Telugu-language science fiction thriller web series created by Ram Vignesh and directed by Pawan Kumar. It is produced by People Media Factory for Aha. The eight-episode series features Amala Paul and Rahul Vijay in lead roles. The title is inspired by song of the same name from the 1953 film Devadasu. It premiered on Aha on 16 July 2021.

Synopsis 

Durga (Amala Paul), a police officer and Adhi (Rahul Vijay), a delivery boy, find themselves in a time loop and relive a day's incidents. When they try to break the cycle they end up with new problems. How they overcome the problems and (if they could) get out of the time loop forms the crux of the story.

Cast 

 Amala Paul as CI Durga Goud
 Rahul Vijay as  Aditya "Adi"
 Ravi Prakash as Mahendra
 Surya Srinivas as SI Thilak Surya
 Pradeep Rudra as Arjun
 Pawan Kumar as Harsha
 Nithya Shri as Parvathy
 Raj Madiraju
 Ram Sandeep Varma as Assistant director Abhinav
 Naveen Itika as Yadagiri
 Meghalekha as Meera
 Karthik Sabareesh as Short film director
 Meesam Suresh as Lakshman
 Eshwar Rachiraju as James

Episodes

Production 
In an interview to The Hindu, director Pawan Kumar told that he was approached by Aha through B. V. Nandini Reddy and said "I liked the story and how certain events repeat themselves on a time loop."

Reception 
Siby Jeyya of India Herald wrote that "Just watch this 'Kudi Yedamaithe' if you are a big fan of the thriller genre with unpredictable twists!"  Praising the story-line, Janani K of India Today stated that "Kudi Yedaimaithe is a great attempt at simplifying a high-concept sci-fi thriller. It could have been perfect if Pawan Kumar had worked on the pacing and the backstory." The Times of India's Sravan Vanaparthy praised the screenplay and performances done by the lead actors.

In contrast, a critic from Pinkvilla gave a rating of 2.5 out of 5 and added that "The narration doesn't give the audience a thorough grip on the turn of events" and praised the cinematography and music.

References

External links 

 https://m.imdb.com/title/tt14932842/mediaviewer/rm3823761409/?ref_=ext_shr_lnk

Telugu-language web series
2021 web series debuts
2021 web series endings
Indian thriller television series
Science fiction web series
Thriller web series
Aha (streaming service) original programming
Indian science fiction television series